The Kidnapping of Edgardo Mortara may refer to

 The Kidnapping of Edgardo Mortara, a 1997 nonfiction book by David Kertzer
 The Kidnapping of Edgardo Mortara (film), an upcoming film adaptation of the Kertzer book